Juan Cuestas was a Uruguayan diplomat.

Background

Juan Cuestas's father Juan Lindolfo Cuestas served two terms as President of Uruguay at the end of the 19th and beginning of the 20th centuries.

Career

Juan Cuestas was a prominent diplomat, appointed Uruguay's first Ambassador to Mexico in 1901. He was previously Minister to Washington, DC.

Being from a culture where political families are common, Juan Cuestas was considered to have Presidential leadership prospects, though they never came to fruition.

References

 
 :es:Juan Lindolfo Cuestas

See also
 List of political families#Uruguay
 List of Uruguayan Ambassadors to the United States#Uruguayan Ministers Plenipotentiary to the United_States

Ambassadors of Uruguay to the United States
Ambassadors of Uruguay to Mexico
Uruguayan diplomats
Year of birth missing
Year of death missing